This is a list of the best selling singles, albums and as according to IRMA. Further listings can be found here.

Top-selling singles
Robin Thicke – "Blurred Lines"
Passenger – "Let Her Go"
Avicii – "Wake Me Up"
Daft Punk – "Get Lucky"
Pink – "Just Give Me a Reason"
Bastile – "Pompeill"
Macklemore & Ryan Lewis – "Thrift Shop"
The Lumineers – "Ho Hey"
Katy Perry – "Roar"
Macklemore & Ryan Lewis – "Can't Hold Us"

Top-selling albums*
Notes:
Midnight Memories – One Direction
Our Version of Events – Emeli Sandé
In a Perfect World – Kodaline
To Be Loved – Michael Bublé
The Marshall Mathers LP 2 – Eminem
Take Me Home – One Direction
Unorthodox Jukebox – Bruno Mars
Random Access Memories – Daft Punk
The Truth About Love – Pink
Up All Night – One Direction

Notes:
 *Compilation albums are not included.

References 

2013 in Irish music
2013